Yong (Korean Hangul: ,) is a family name used in Korea, as well as a character in some Korean given names. It may also mean sun in some cases. As a family name, it may also be spelled Ryong in Korea. It is of Sino-Korean origin.

As a family name
Most hanja with the reading Yong are pronounced that way in all dialects of Korean. However, the character used to write the family name (meaning "dragon"), is also read as Ryong and spelled as such in hangul (룡). This is the standard reading in North Korea and among Koreans in China. In a study by the National Institute of the Korean Language based on a sample of year 2007 applications for South Korean passports, it was found that 97% of people with this surname chose to have it spelled it in Latin letters as Yong, while 3% chose to spell it Young, and none spelled it Ryong.

Yong is one of the 100 most common given names in China
The 2000 South Korean Census found 14,067 people and 4,320 households with this family name. They identified with the following bon-gwan (the hometown of a clan lineage, not necessary the actual residence of the clan members):
Hongcheon (in what is today Gangwon-do, South Korea): 12,733 and 3,930 households
Gaeseong (in what is today South Pyongan Province, North Korea): 439 people and 130 households
Suwon (in what is today Gyeonggi-do, South Korea): 264 people and 72 households
Gwangju (in what is today South Korea): 206 people and 59 households
Yongin (in what is today Gyeonggi-do, South Korea): 174 people and 54 households
Paju (in what is today Gyeonggi-do, South Korea): 164 people and 54 households
Other or unreported bon-gwan: 87 people and 21 households
	 
People with this family name include:
Yong Hyun-Jin (born 1988), South Korean football player
Yong Jun-hyung (born 1989), South Korean rapper
Yong Hye-in (born 1990), South Korean civil society activist
Yong Lee-ja (born 1991), North Korean football player

In given names
Yong is an element in some given names. The meaning differs based on the hanja used to write it. There are 24 hanja with the reading "yong" and one with the reading "ryong" on the South Korean government's official list of hanja which may be used in given names; common ones are listed in the table above.

People

People from South Korea with the single-syllable given name Yong or Ryong include
Jang Yong (born 1945), South Korean footballer
Ryoo Ryong (born 1957), South Korean chemistry professor
Jim Yong Kim (born Kim Yong, 1959), South Korean-born American physician, 12th President of the World Bank
Lee Yong (luger) (born 1978), South Korean luger
Kang Yong (born 1979), South Korean footballer
Min Ryoung (born 1982), South Korean short track speed skater
Lee Yong (footballer born 1986), South Korean footballer
Lee Yong (footballer born 1989), South Korean footballer

As name element
Names containing this element include:

First syllable
Jae-yong
Myung-yong
Seung-yong
Sung-yong
Tae-yong
Won-yong

Second syllable
Yong-gi
Yong-ho
Yong-hwa
Yong-joon

See also
Chinese given names
List of Korean family names
List of Korean given names

References

Chinese-language surnames
Korean-language surnames
Korean given names